407 may refer to:
 407 (number)
 407 AD, a year
 407 BC, a year
 Area code 407

Literacy
 Minuscule 407, a Greek manuscript

Military
 407 Long Range Patrol Squadron
 407th Support Brigade

Science and technology
 407 Arachne, a large asteroid
 HTTP 407
 IBM 407, a tabulating machine
 NGC 407, a lenticular galaxy
 Poloxamer 407

Transportation

Automobiles
 Bristol 407, a British sports tourer
 Moskvitch 407, a Russian compact estate/van
 Peugeot 407, a French mid-size car lineup
 Tata 407, an Indian pickup truck
 Weiwang 407, a Chinese electric cargo van

Helicopters
 Bell 407, a civil utility helicopter

Roads and routes
 List of highways numbered 407
 407 Transitway, a planned bus route along Ontario 407
 Emirates Flight 407, a planned flight from Melbourne to Dubai